The 1994 Air Force Falcons football team represented the United States Air Force Academy in the 1994 NCAA Division I-A football season. The team was led by 11th-year head coach Fisher DeBerry and played its home games at Falcon Stadium. It finished the season with an 8–4 record overall and a 5–3 record in Western Athletic Conference games.

Schedule

Personnel

References

Air Force
Air Force Falcons football seasons
Air Force Falcons football